Kreepen is a small village of about 150 inhabitants in the municipality of Kirchlinteln which belongs to the district of Verden (Aller) in the federal state of Lower Saxony, Germany.

Villages in Lower Saxony